The World Series of Snooker was played for the first time in the 2008/2009 season. Although there was a previous incarnation of the event organised by Matchroom Sport, that ran in the 1987/88 season, and from 1990/91 until 1992/93. It was a series of five non-ranking tournaments spread over Europe, where top professional players performed against regional wildcard players. The series consisted of four tournaments plus a Grand Final for which the winner earned €50,000.

The winner of each tournament received five points, the runner-up three and losing semi-finalists one each. These points determined the seeding positions for the Grand Final, with the top four getting a bye to quarter-finals and fifth and sixth getting a bye to the second round. In the final Shaun Murphy defeated John Higgins 6–2.

World Series of Snooker Jersey

The first event was held in Saint Helier, Jersey between 21 and 22 June 2008.

John Higgins won in the final 6–3 against Mark Selby.

Players

Professionals:
 Mark Selby
 Ken Doherty
 Shaun Murphy
 John Higgins

Wildcards:
 Rafał Jewtuch
 Gary Britton
 Martyn Desperques
 Aaron Canavan

Main draw

Century breaks
105  Mark Selby
104  John Higgins

World Series of Snooker Berlin

The second event was held in Berlin, Germany between 12 and 13 July 2008.

Graeme Dott won in the final 6–1 against Shaun Murphy.

Players

Professionals:
 Graeme Dott
 John Higgins
 Stephen Maguire
 Shaun Murphy

Wildcards:
 Chris McBreen
 Lasse Münstermann
 Hans Blankaert
 Patrick Einsle

Main draw

Century breaks
132  Shaun Murphy
113  Graeme Dott

World Series of Snooker Warsaw

The third event was held in Warsaw, Poland between 25 and 26 October 2008.

Ding Junhui won in the final 6–4 against Ken Doherty.

Players

Professionals:
  Steve Davis
  Mark Selby
  Ding Junhui
  Ken Doherty

Wildcards:
  Rafał Górecki
  Mariusz Sirko
  Piotr Murat
  Rafał Jewtuch

Main draw

Century breaks
102, 100  Mark Selby
101  Ding Junhui

World Series of Snooker Moscow

The fourth event was held in Moscow, Russia between 22 and 23 November 2008.

John Higgins won in the final 5–0 against Ding Junhui.

Players

Professionals:
  John Higgins
  Ding Junhui
  Mark Selby

Wildcards:
  Anna Mazhirina
  Shachar Ruberg
  Sergey Vasiliev
  Ruslan Chinakhov
  Sergey Isaenko

Main draw

Century breaks
127  John Higgins

Points table

World Series of Snooker Grand Final

The Grand Final of the World Series of Snooker was held in Portimão, Portugal between 8–10 May 2009.

Shaun Murphy won in the final 6–2 against John Higgins. This was the only Grand Final in the history of the World Series of Snooker. Murphy won the title a week after losing the World Snooker Championship Final to Higgins.

Players

Group one:

  Ryan Day
  Lasse Munstermann
  Michal Zielinski
  Garry Britton

Group two:

  Jimmy White
  Schachar Ruberg
  Itaro Santos
  Luca Brecel

Knockout stage:

  Ryan Day
  Garry Britton
  Luca Brecel
  Jimmy White
  Steve Davis
  Stephen Maguire
  Ken Doherty
  Shaun Murphy
  John Higgins
  Ding Junhui
  Graeme Dott
  Mark Selby

Note: professional players in bold.

Round-robin stage
Round one was played in a round robin format. The matches were best of seven frames. Each player played each other once. The winner and runner-up advanced to round two.

Group one

Table

Matches:
 Ryan Day 4–0 Garry Britton
 Michał Zieliński 1–4 Lasse Münstermann
 Ryan Day 4–1 Michał Zieliński
 Lasse Münstermann 2–4 Garry Britton
 Ryan Day 4–1 Lasse Münstermann
 Garry Britton 4–2 Michał Zieliński

Group two

Table

Matches:
 Jimmy White 4–1 Itaro Santos
 Luca Brecel 4–2 Schachar Ruberg
 Jimmy White 4–0 Schachar Ruberg
 Itaro Santos 1–4 Luca Brecel
 Jimmy White 3–4 Luca Brecel
 Schachar Ruberg 2–4 Itaro Santos

Knockout stage

Century breaks
 122, 105, 100  Shaun Murphy
 101  John Higgins
 100  Graeme Dott

References

2008
World Series 2009
2008 in Polish sport
World Series 2008
2008 in German sport
2008 in Russian sport
2009 in Portuguese sport
Sport in Jersey
Sports competitions in Berlin
Sports competitions in Warsaw
Sports competitions in Moscow
Sport in Portimão
Snooker competitions in Germany
Cue sports in Russia
Cue sports in Portugal
Snooker in Poland